Jason Adjepong Worilds (born March 3, 1988) is a former American football outside linebacker who played in the National Football League (NFL). He was drafted by the Pittsburgh Steelers in the second round of the 2010 NFL Draft. He played college football at Virginia Tech.

Early life
Worilds attended Carteret High School in Carteret, New Jersey where he was a two-sport athlete in football and track. He played on the defensive line as well as linebacker and fullback. During his junior year, he posted 87 tackles, 22 of them for a loss and 12 sacks.  On the opposite side of the ball, he had 61 carries for 330 yards and four touchdowns.  He earned Associated Press All-State honors.  His success continued on into his senior year in which he had 107 tackles, 18 for a loss and 10 sacks, again earning All-State honors and becoming the first player in school history to have the honor in consecutive honors.

Coming out of high school, Worilds was rated the seventh best strongside defensive end by Rivals.com. He was ranked the eight best in the country from scout.com.

College career 

Worilds began by seeing the field in two games on defense and special teams. He blocked a punt against the North Carolina Tar Heels and returned it for seven yards. After though, he elected to have season-ending shoulder surgery and was granted a medical red-shirt. Worilds picked up where he left off in 2007, and had two Quarterback hurries in the opener against East Carolina University. In a game against Ohio, Worilds suffered a high-ankle sprain and missed the following game against William & Mary. The next season, he started 12 games and played in 13 games. He was 4th on his team in tackles with 62. His 21 QB Hurries led the Hokies. Jason posted 7 tackles against Virginia Tech's bitter rivals, University of Virginia. However, he had to sit out of the Orange Bowl because of a shoulder injury. In 2009, Jason Worlids started in all of Virginia Tech's 13 games. During that time, he recorded 49 tackles, 11 tackles for loss, 4.5 sacks, 1 pass broken up, 1 pass defended, 1 forced fumble, 42 quarterback hurries, and a whopping 32 Quarterback Hits. After his Junior year, Jason decided to declare for the 2010 NFL Draft. He finished his college career with 41 Games Played, 25 Games Started, 132 tackles (62 solo tackles), 34 Tackles for Loss, 15.00 sacks, 2 Pass Break-Ups, 2 Passes Defended, 67 Quarterback Hits, 3 Forced Fumbles, and 1 Blocked Kick.

Professional career

The Pittsburgh Steelers selected Worilds in the second round (52nd overall) of the 2010 NFL Draft. On March 3, 2014, he signed his $9.754 million transition tender to stay with Pittsburgh.

On March 11, 2015, Worilds unexpectedly announced his retirement from the NFL at the age of 27 and after five years as a Pittsburgh Steeler. The choice to retire surprised many due to the start of the free agency period starting the day prior. He became an unrestricted free agent for the first time in his career and was expected to receive a $7-$8 million salary with at least $15 million guaranteed. Multiple sources speculated Worilds chose to retire to dedicate his life to his religion as a Jehovah's Witness.
He finished his career with 25.5 career sacks.

NFL statistics

Key
 GP: games played
 COMB: combined tackles
 TOTAL: total tackles
 AST: assisted tackles
 SACK: sacks
 FF: forced fumbles
 FR: fumble recoveries
 FR YDS: fumble return yards 
 INT: interceptions
 IR YDS: interception return yards
 AVG IR: average interception return
 LNG: longest interception return
 TD: interceptions returned for touchdown
 PD: passes defensed

Personal life 
After retiring from the NFL, Worilds announced he left football and became a member of the Jehovah's Witnesses.

References

External links
Pittsburgh Steelers bio
Virginia Tech Hokies bio

1988 births
Living people
African-American players of American football
American football defensive ends
American football linebackers
American Jehovah's Witnesses
Carteret High School alumni
Converts to Jehovah's Witnesses
People from Carteret, New Jersey
Pittsburgh Steelers players
Players of American football from New Jersey
Sportspeople from Middlesex County, New Jersey
Sportspeople from Rahway, New Jersey
Virginia Tech Hokies football players
21st-century African-American sportspeople
20th-century African-American people